This is a list of municipal commissioners for finance of Stockholm (finansborgarråd). In English, the title is often translated as Mayor of Stockholm.

The office of municipal commissioner for finance was set up in 1920, replacing the previous office of mayor. While the mayor (borgmästare) before 1920 was appointed by the government, the municipal commissioner for finance is elected by the Stockholm city council. After a reform in 1940, the municipal commissioner for finance always represents the ruling political majority coalition in the city. From 1994 the municipal commissioner for finance is also chairman of the municipal council (kommunstyrelsen), a title often called mayor in English.

Mayors from 1920 till now

References

Mayors of Stockholm
Stockholm
Mayors of Stockholm
Government of Stockholm
History of Stockholm
Mayors